Banomali Re is a Bengali devotional studio album of renowned Bollywood playback singer Shreya Ghoshal. Released January 1, 2002, the album consists of 8 tracks, which are bhajans in praise of Lord Krishna. Later in the year 2007, the same songs were again released in the album named Krishna Bina Ache Ke, but under different titles.

Track listing

References

External links 

Shreya Ghoshal albums
2002 albums
Albums by Indian artists